The 133rd Airlift Wing (133 AW) is a unit of the Minnesota Air National Guard, stationed at Minneapolis–Saint Paul Joint Air Reserve Station, Minnesota. If activated to federal service, the Wing is gained by the United States Air Force Air Mobility Command.

The 109th Airlift Squadron assigned to the Wing's 133rd Operations Group, is a descendant organization of the World War I 109th Aero Squadron, established on 27 August 1917. It was reformed on 17 January 1921, as the 109th Observation Squadron, being the first of 29 aviation National Guard squadrons to receive federal recognition following World War I.

Overview
The 133rd Airlift Wing (AW) is a unit of the Minnesota Air National Guard, stationed at Minneapolis–Saint Paul Joint Air Reserve Station.  Gained by the USAF Air Mobility Command if federalized, the unit is an air transport organization flying C-130H Hercules tactical airlifters.  Its normal flying operations include air-drop training and transport missions. The four engine C-130 turboprop aircraft can land on short runways or airdrop personnel and equipment into areas lacking an airfield. These capabilities are well suited for disaster relief missions.

The 133rd AW's mission is to provide combat ready air crews, support personnel, and aircraft for the airlift of passengers and cargo anywhere in the world. Upon direction of the Governor, the unit can furnish personnel and equipment, including aircraft, to assist in natural disaster relief or to safeguard life and property in Minnesota.

Units
The 133rd Airlift Wing consists of the following units:
 133rd Operations Group
 109th Airlift Squadron
 109th Aeromedical Evacuation Squadron
 133rd Maintenance Group
 133rd Mission Support Group
 133rd Medical Group

History

The wartime 367th Fighter Group was reactivated and redesignated as the 133rd Fighter Group, and was allotted to the Minnesota Air National Guard, on 24 May 1946. It was organized at Holman Field, Saint Paul and was extended federal recognition on 28 August 1947 by Air Defense Command.  In the fall of 1950, the Air National Guard reorganized under the wing base organization system, and the 133d Fighter Wing was activated on 1 November 1950 to command the 133d Fighter Group and its newly formed support organizations.

Air defense

On 2 March 1951, the 133rd Fighter Wing was federalized and brought to active duty due to the Korean War and assigned to Air Defense Command (ADC).   The 133rd Fighter-Interceptor Group controlled the 109th Fighter-Interceptor Squadron at Minneapolis and the 179th Fighter-Interceptor Squadron at Duluth.  The 133rd Wing and Group were inactivated on 6 February 1952 and the squadrons reassigned to the 31st Air Division of Air Defense Command for the remainder of their federal service.  The unit was reformed as the 133rd Fighter-Interceptor Wing under Minnesota state control on 1 December 1952.

After the Korean War, the wing was reformed by 1 January 1953 and resumed its air defense mission.   Was upgraded by ADC in 1954 to the dedicated F-94A Starfire all-weather interceptor. With this new aircraft, the mission of the 109th Fighter-Interceptor Squadron changed from day interceptor to day and night all-weather interceptor. In 1958 the 109th again upgraded to the improved F-89H Scorpion.

Strategic Airlift

In 1960, the 133rd FIW was reassigned to Military Air Transport Service (MATS) as its gaining command, trading in its air defense interceptors for 4-engines C-97 Stratofreighter transports. With air transportation recognized as a critical wartime need, the unit was redesignated the 133rd Air Transport Wing, Heavy. During the 1961 Berlin Crisis, the wing was federalized on 1 October 1961. From Minneapolis, the 109th ATS augmented MATS airlift capability worldwide in support of the Air Force's needs. It returned again to Minnesota state control on 31 August 1962. Throughout the 1960s, the unit flew long-distance transport missions in support of Air Force requirements, frequently sending aircraft to Hawaii, Japan, the Philippines, and during the Vietnam War, to both South Vietnam, Okinawa and Thailand.

Tactical Airlift

 
The C-97s were retired in 1971 and the 133rd TAW was transferred to Tactical Air Command (TAC) as its gaining command. It transitioned to the C-130A Hercules theater transport, flying missions in support of TAC throughout the United States and Alaska.  In 1974 the unit was returned to Military Airlift Command (MAC) when TAC transferred out its troop carrier mission.  In the early 1970s, USAF's "Total Force" policy brought the wing into full partnership with its Air Force counterparts by mandating co-operation and teamwork between Air Guard and active duty Air Force units in all phases of military airlift operations. As a result, in succeeding years the unit's C-130s traveled to all corners of the world, airlifting troops, passengers, and cargo during training missions, exercise deployments, and real-world military operations to support Federal and State military airlift requirements.

The unit has been upgraded over the years with newer C-130E aircraft in 1981 and currently flies the C-130H, which it received in 1995.  2011 marked the 90th anniversary of the 1921 decision to make Minnesota's 109th Aero Squadron the first federally recognized National Guard flying unit in the country. To commemorate the heritage of the Minnesota Air National Guard, the 133rd Airlift Wing hosted an Air Expo, welcoming upwards of 15,000 members of the community to the base to celebrate.

During 2011, the 109th Airlift Squadron deployed 528 Airmen to 17 countries, serving in support of U.S. operations worldwide, including humanitarian missions to Africa, Honduras and Indonesia.   The squadron provides combat-ready air crews, support personnel, and aircraft for the airlift of passengers and cargo anywhere in the world. Upon direction of the Governor, the unit furnishes personnel and equipment, including aircraft, to assist in natural disaster relief or to safeguard life and property in Minnesota.

Lineage
 Constituted as the 133d Fighter Wing in October 1950
 Activated on 1 November 1950
 Federalized and placed on active duty on 1 March 1951
 Redesignated 133d Fighter-Interceptor Wing On 2 March 1951
 Inactivated on 6 February 1952
 Released from active duty, returned to Minnesota state control and activated on 1 December 1952
 Redesignated: 133d Air Defense Wing on 15 April 1956
 Redesignated: 133d Air Transport Wing, Heavy on 15 January 1960
 Federalized and placed on active duty, 1 October 1961
 Released from active duty and returned to Minnesota state control, 31 August 1962
 Redesignated: 133d Military Airlift Wing on 1 January 1966
 Redesignated: 133d Tactical Airlift Wing  on 20 March 1971
 Redesignated: 133d Airlift Wing on 16 March 1992

Assignments
 Minnesota Air National Guard, 1 November 1950
 Tenth Air Force, 1 March 1951
 Eastern Air Defense Force, 2 March 1951
 Central Air Defense Force, 20 May 1951 – 6 February 1952
 Minnesota Air National Guard, 1 December 1952
 Gained by: Central Air Defense Force, Air Defense Command
 Gained by: Eastern Transport Air Force, military Air Transport Service, 1 July 1960
 Eastern Transport Air Force, 1 October 1961
 Minnesota Air National Guard, 31 August 1962 – present
 Gained by: Eastern Transport Air Force, Military Air Transport Service
 Gained by: Military Airlift Command, 8 January 1966
 Gained by: Tactical Air Command, 20 March 1971
 Gained by: Military Airlift Command, 1 December 1974
 Gained by: Air Mobility Command, 1 June 1992
 Gained by: Air Combat Command, 1 October 1993
 Gained by: Air Mobility Command, 1 April 1997 – present

Components
 Groups
 133rd Fighter Group (later 133d Fighter-Interceptor Group, 133d Fighter Group, 133d Air Transport Group, 133d Military Airlift Group, 133d Tactical Airlift Group, 133d Operations Group, 1 November 1950 – 6 February 1952, 1 December 1952 – 9 February 1975, 16 March 1992 – Present
 109th Tactical Airlift Squadron (later 109th Airlift Squadron), 9 February 1975 – 1 March 1994

Stations 
 Holman Field, 1 November 1950
 Fort Snelling (later Snelling Air Force Station, 21 January 1951 – 6 February 1952
 Holman Field, 1 December 1952
 Wold-Chamberlain Field (later Minneapolis-St. Paul Metropolitan Airport, Minneapolis–Saint Paul Joint Air Reserve Station), Minnesota, 28 August 1947

Aircraft

 North American F-51D Mustang, 1950–1954
 Lockheed F-94A Starfire, 1954–1957
 Lockheed F-94B Starfire, 1954–1957
 Lockheed F-94C Starfire, 1957–1960

 Northrop F-89H Scorpion, 1958–1960
 Boeing C-97G Stratofreighter, 1960–1971
 Lockheed C-130A Hercules, 1971–1981
 Lockheed C-130E Hercules, 1981–1995
 Lockheed C-130H Hercules, 1995–present

Decorations
 Air Force Outstanding Unit Award

References

 A Handbook of Aerospace Defense Organization 1946–1980, by Lloyd H. Cornett and Mildred W. Johnson, Office of History, Aerospace Defense Center, Peterson Air Force Base, Colorado
 Maurer, Maurer. Air Force Combat Units of World War II. Washington, D.C.: U.S. Government Printing Office 1961 (republished 1983, Office of Air Force History)
 Rogers, B. (2006). United States Air Force Unit Designations Since 1978. 
 Gross, Charles J (1996), The Air National Guard and the American Military Tradition, United States Dept. of Defense
 133rd Airlift Wing History

External links 

 133rd Airlift Wing official site
 133rd Airlift Wing at the Air National Guard

Wings of the United States Air National Guard
Military units and formations in Minnesota
0133
Minneapolis–Saint Paul International Airport